Mark Edward Ormerod  (born 3 August 1957) was a British civil servant and chief executive of the Supreme Court of the United Kingdom and the Judicial Committee of the Privy Council from 2015 to 2020.

He was educated at Oundle School, the University of Leeds and the University of Tours.

Ormerod was previously the Chief Executive of the Law Commission. He also held posts as Chief Executive of the Probation Associations and was Director of Access to Justice Policy at the Ministry of Justice.

Notes

1957 births
Living people
People educated at Oundle School
Alumni of the University of Leeds
Civil servants in the Lord Chancellor's Department
Companions of the Order of the Bath
Supreme Court of the United Kingdom